The Old Man's War series is a series of science fiction novels by John Scalzi.  The first book in the series, Old Man's War, was first published in 2005 by Tor Books, and was nominated for the Hugo Award for Best Novel in 2006.

Television series adaptation
In August 2014 SyFy announced that they are working on developing a TV series based on the Old Man's War series, currently called Ghost Brigades, with Wolfgang Petersen overseeing development.

In December 2017, it was announced that Netflix had acquired Old Man's War and would develop it as an original film.

Works

References

 
Sequel novels